Chickies Historic District is a national historic district located at East Donegal Township, West Hempfield Township, and Marietta, Lancaster County, Pennsylvania. The district includes 32 contributing buildings, 16 contributing sites, and 4 contributing structures in three areas.  They are: 1) floodplain along the Susquehanna River containing archaeological remains of iron furnaces; 2) the "Ironmasters' Hill" area of Marietta with five residences associated with ironmasters (c. 1848–1876); and 3) the Donegal Creek area with farmland, iron pits, and limestone quarries owned by the ironmasters.

It was listed on the National Register of Historic Places in 2005.

References

Historic districts in Lancaster County, Pennsylvania
Historic districts on the National Register of Historic Places in Pennsylvania
National Register of Historic Places in Lancaster County, Pennsylvania